Matthew White (c 1766 – 11 March 1840) was a British politician. He sat in the House of Commons of the United Kingdom as a Member of Parliament (MP) for Hythe, from 1802 to 1806 and 1812–1818.

References

External links 
Profile at Theyworkforyou.com
 

1766 births
1840 deaths
Members of the Parliament of the United Kingdom for English constituencies
UK MPs 1802–1806
UK MPs 1812–1818